Auguste Joseph Ricord, nicknamed Il Commandante, (26 April 1911 – 1985) was a French-Corsican heroin trafficker, convicted Nazi collaborator, and one of the founding members of the French Connection, a mafiosi-type organisation involved in heroin trade, based in France in the 1950s and 1960s.

An agent of Henri Lafont, a member of the Carlingue (French auxiliaries of the Gestapo), under the Vichy regime, he used part of the funds stolen by the Carlingue during the war to create drug laboratories near Marseille. Heroin was refined there before being exported to the US.

On 19 April 1968, Ricord was arrested along with fellow Corsicans Lucien Sarti and François Chiappe for questioning regarding the robbery of a branch of the Banco de la Nación Argentina. The three were released due to lack of evidence.

Auguste Ricord was arrested in 1972 in Asunción, Paraguay. Corsican influence was believed to have been behind the U.S.'s difficulties in extraditing him. He was eventually extradited to the US, sentenced to 22 years in prison and spent 10 years in jail until pardoned. 
Ricord returned to Paraguay in 1983 and died of illness two years later.

References

Further reading
 Contrabandista!, Evert Clark and Nicholas Horrock (Praeger Publishers, 1973). [Details his arrest in Paraguay, extradition, and conviction by two Newsweek reports.]
"The Hunt for Andre" , Reader's Digest, May 1973 pp. 225–259
PAUL L. MONTGOMERY Ricord Is Convicted of Plot To Smuggle Drugs to U.S. NYT, 16 December 1972
Drug use in America: problem in perspective: second report, Volume 1 By United States. Commission on Marihuana and Drug Abuse 1973

1911 births
1985 deaths
Corsican collaborators with Nazi Germany
French Connection gangsters
French collaborators with Nazi Germany
French people imprisoned abroad
French drug traffickers
Gestapo personnel
People extradited from Paraguay
People extradited to the United States
Prisoners and detainees of the United States federal government